CVA is the debut full-length album from Philadelphia, PA's Paint It Black. It features much shorter and arguably more aggressive songs than their follow-up album, Paradise, two and a half minutes shorter despite sporting three more tracks. The song "Womb Envy" was featured on the soundtrack of the 2003 skateboarding video game Tony Hawk's Underground.

Track listing
All songs by Paint It Black
 "Cannibal"  – 0:35
 "Anesthesia"  – 0:44
 "Womb Envy"  – 1:28 mp3
 "Atticus Finch"  – 1:39
 "CVA"  – 1:32
 "Void"  – 0:59
 "The Insider"  – 0:43
 "Cutting Class"  – 1:39
 "Head Hurts Hands on Fire"  – 0:38
 "Bravo, Another Beautiful 'Fuck You' Song!"  – 1:19
 "Watered Down"  – 1:20
 "The Fine Art of Falling Apart"  – 1:20
 "This Song Is Short Because It's Not Political"  – 0:26
 "Less Deicide, More Minor Threat..."  – 1:03
 "Four Simple Steps to Total Life Satisfaction"  – 0:59
 "Short Changed"  – 1:27
 "Why Film the Carnage?"  – 0:42

Personnel
Dan Yemin – vocals, guitar
Dave Hause – lead guitar
Andy Nelson – bass guitar, vocals
David Wagenschutz – drums
Dean Baltulonis – engineering
Alan Douches – mastering
J. Dean – layout

See also
Cerebrovascular accident (aka CVA) – What the album title and the song of the same name refer to
Atticus Finch – Fictional character referred to in the song of the same name
Deicide, Minor Threat Bands referred to in the song "Less Deicide, More Minor Threat..."

References

Paint It Black (band) albums
2003 debut albums
Jade Tree (record label) albums